John Divers (6 August 1911 – 8 June 1984) was a Scottish footballer, who played for Celtic, Morton, Oldham Athletic and the Scottish national side.

Career
Divers was born in Clydebank, Dunbartonshire. He was a creative, goal-scoring but tough inside left, who joined Celtic from Renfrew Juniors in 1932. He helped the club to win the Scottish league championship in 1937–38 and was also the creative mastermind behind its victory in the Empire Exhibition Trophy of summer 1938, when Celtic beat Everton 1–0 in the final, before winning a Glasgow Cup at the end of the same year. He made 70 League appearances for the club, but played over 200 matches overall including unofficial wartime games (he did not see frontline service, instead working in a reserved occupation in the local shipyards, so was able to continue playing).

He left Celtic for Morton in 1945, moving to Oldham Athletic for several months in 1947 before returning to finish his career with a second spell with Morton between 1948 and 1949. He earned one cap for Scotland, against Ireland in October 1938.

Family
Divers was the nephew of former Celtic and Ireland player Patsy Gallacher, while his son, also named John, played for Celtic and Partick Thistle. His family connections mean he was also related to fellow footballing descendants of Patsy Gallacher: sons Willie and Tommy, and grandsons Brian and Kevin.

References

External links
 John Divers profile at thecelticwiki.com

1911 births
1984 deaths
Scottish footballers
Celtic F.C. players
Greenock Morton F.C. players
Oldham Athletic A.F.C. players
Scotland international footballers
Sportspeople from Clydebank
Footballers from West Dunbartonshire
Association football inside forwards
Scottish Football League players
Portadown F.C. players
Scottish football managers
Portadown F.C. managers
Renfrew F.C. players
Scottish Junior Football Association players
Gallacher family (footballers)